Polisen i Strömstad is a Swedish drama comedy television series which premiered on SVT on 21 January 1982.

Series overview

Episodes

Polisen som vägrade svara (1982)

Polisen som vägrade ge upp (1984)

Polisen som vägrade ta semester (1988)

Polisen och domarmordet (1993)

Polisen och pyromanen (1996)

References 

Lists of comedy-drama television series episodes